Héctor Milberg (17 October 1904 – 1972) was an Argentine bobsledder. He competed in the four-man event at the 1928 Winter Olympics.

References

1904 births
1972 deaths
Argentine male bobsledders
Olympic bobsledders of Argentina
Bobsledders at the 1928 Winter Olympics
Sportspeople from Buenos Aires